The Italian ambassador to the Democratic Republic of Congo is the official representative of the Government in Rome to the Government of the Democratic Republic of the Congo. As of February 22, 2021, that office is vacant.

List of representatives

References 

 
Democratic Republic of the Congo
Italy